A combo television unit, or a TV/VCR combo, sometimes known as a televideo, is a television with a VCR,  DVD player, or sometimes both, built into a single unit. These converged devices have the advantages (compared to a separate TV and VCR) of saving space and increasing portability. Such units entered the market during the mid-to-late 1980s when VCRs had become ubiquitous household devices. By this time, the VHS format had become standard; thus the vast majority of TV/VCR combos are VHS-based.

Most combo units have composite inputs on the front and/or back to connect a home video game console, a second VCR, a DVD player, or a camcorder. Some units may also include a headphone jack or S-Video inputs. 

Though nearly all TV/VCR combination sets have monaural (mono) sound though with stereo soundtrack compatibility, there are a large number of TV/VCR combos with a stereo TV tuner, but a mono VCR (some may even include a mono sound input alongside a composite video input. Some models from Panasonic also included an FM tuner. 

When DVDs were released, brands such as Toshiba introduced a TV/DVD/VCR combo. However, many of these units turned out to have unreliable DVD players and never had a large place in the TV market. 

Modern televisions tend to be mostly composed of solid state components, while VCRs require physical movement for both the inner workings of the VCR and the actual viewing of a VHS tape. VCRs also tend to require occasional service to upkeep the VCR, including things like cleaning the heads, capstan, and pinch rollers. For this reason, it is not uncommon for the included VCR to cease functioning or to become unreliable years before a similar fate befalls the television component due to lack of easy maintenance.

As late as 2006, flat-panel TVs with integrated DVD players appeared on the market, and integrated TV/DVD sets started overtaking the TV/VCR market. This is due to both the low price and overwhelming availability of DVDs and more compact form factor, as opposed to the increasingly rare video cassettes and near-extinction of cathode ray tube displays in the consumer market. However in the late 2010s, Smart TVs have become affordable and have been a popular choice for video playback and are considered a modern version of the combo TV.

Types

TV/VCR combos

History
Some of the earliest combo TVs with a built-in video playback device were ones that supported Cartrivision. Cartrivision-equipped TVs date back before even the introduction of VHS or stand-alone video playback devices in the consumer market (but with the exception of some open reel video playback devices that could be connected to TVs back in the 1960s), which the majority of combo TVs had in the late 1980s and 1990s.

Special features
During the era of their popularity, many of these units displayed product videos in stores or for other commercial displays. The main reason for this was unlike most low-end, standalone VCRs, many included an automatic rewind feature. After the tape came to an end, the tape would automatically rewind and then play from the beginning of the tape again. This made it useful for product demonstrations to be replayed over and over without an employee continually having to manually rewind the tape.

TV/Computer combos

Some fully functional computer systems or game consoles have been built into some models of TVs over time.  Hewlett-Packard currently has a version of their TouchSmart line of computers with a built-in TV tuner, and even has a built-in DVR; also making it a TV/DVR combo which is a relatively rare concept. As of late 2006, Samsung introduced an LED TV with a proprietary operating system with Internet access to websites like Facebook, YouTube, Hulu, Netflix, and other sites.  Other TV/Computer combo equipment can simply just be flatscreen TVs with USB ports which allows USB flash drives and external hard drives to be connected to allow for audio and video playback, in which it can give a streamlined, fully solid-state profile.

Almost every modern day TV sets have simplified CPUs and memory chips for basic functions such as channels and video settings, and video timing for LCD flat panels; however these examples are not sophisticated enough to qualify as significant examples.  Other computer parts are used for real-time playback of DVDs on combo TVs with DVD player (and Blu-ray Disc for more high-end models) functionality; however these dedicated functions alone don't qualify as significant examples either.

In the modern day, the distinction between a combo TV and an all-in-one PC have blurred with the modern smart TV concept.

In 2010, Sony introduced a TV with a built-in PlayStation 2.

Past
In the past, other attempts have been made to integrate computer functionality in CRT or display enclosures.  However, prior to the concept of TVs with built-in computer motherboards, early portable computers had monitors of their own, but no TV tuner since it was a cost-prohibitive feature in the late 1970s/early 1980s.  The Compucolor (followed by the Compucolor II of the 1970s was one of the first computer systems to be contained entirely within the casing of a video screen.  Instead of being a functional computer system for hobbyist programming with a TV tuner, the tuner was removed from the casing of an RCA brand TV (GE for the Compucolor II) since such a feature during the 1970s would have been too costly for such an application.  But such a device would be pulled off the market due to FCC concerns over a lack of radiation shielding from the CRT.  As a notable example, but without a built-in TV tuner, the first model of the well-known Macintosh line of computers had a built-in monitor.

In the mid-1980s, Sharp introduced the C1 NES TV which was capable of playing NES and Famicom games and the first one to also have a TV tuner. Years later, in the mid-1990s, Apple Computer introduced the Macintosh TV (not to be confused with the current-day Apple TV set-top box) which was capable of capturing still images of TV broadcasts to the hard drive since hard drives at the time were not big enough for practical DVR use even though experimental use of hard drives for video capture only captured less than a minute of video back in the 1960s. Handheld game consoles such as the Game Gear had a full-color display housed with a CPU, but wasn't a true TV-computer combo unit since a modular TV tuner peripheral was required.

Recent models like Sony's TV/computer combo system in its VAIO line of computers was discontinued due to being overpriced and underpowered for today's respective PC and TV markets.
TVs might have a store built in which allows users to download internet browser and any apps like Netflix.

See also
Handheld television
VCR/DVD combo
VCR/Blu-ray combo
Internet television, the software equivalent of a TV/computer combo

References

Television technology
Video hardware
Television sets